Eudemis gyrotis is a moth of the family Tortricidae. It is found in Vietnam, India, Japan and Taiwan.

It is a rather variable species. Adults are light grey with a violet tinge or entirely suffused with reddish fulvous.

The larvae feed on the leaves of Myrica rubra. They roll the leaves of their host plant.

References

Moths described in 1909
Olethreutini
Moths of Japan